The 2011 Tour de Suisse was the 75th running of the Tour de Suisse cycling stage race. It started on 11 June with an individual time trial in Lugano and ended with another individual time trial on 19 June, in Schaffhausen. It was the 16th race of the 2011 UCI World Tour season.

Leipheimer, who was only third on the stage behind Fabian Cancellara and team-mate Andreas Klöden, triumphed by four seconds over Cunego after  of racing. Kruijswijk managed to hold on to third place in the overall classification, 62 seconds down on Leipheimer, but eight seconds ahead of another  rider, Jakob Fuglsang.

In the race's other classifications,  rider Andy Schleck won the King of the Mountains classification, 's Peter Sagan won the points classification after placing five times in the top three of stage results, Lloyd Mondory of  finished clear at the top of the sprints classification, with  also finishing at the head of the teams classification.

Route

Stages

Stage 1
11 June 2011 – Lugano,  individual time trial (ITT)

Stage 2
12 June 2011 – Airolo to Crans-Montana,

Stage 3
13 June 2011 – Brig-Glis to Grindelwald,

Stage 4
14 June 2011 – Grindelwald to Huttwil,

Stage 5
15 June 2011 – Huttwil to Tobel-Tägerschen,

Stage 6
16 June 2011 – Tobel-Tägerschen to Triesenberg (Liechtenstein),

Stage 7

Stage 8
18 June 2011 – Tübach to Schaffhausen, 
Rabobank's Bauke Mollema, who was placed second overall at the time, punctured about 15 km from the finish. When the Leopard Trek team heard it, they led the chase, and Mollema was unable to get back to the group, and he finished 48 seconds behind. Rabobank assistant directeur sportif Frans Maassen said that Mollema should have had a chance to win the stage.

Stage 9
19 June 2011 – Schaffhausen,  individual time trial (ITT)

Leadership classification

References

External links

 

Tour de Suisse
Tour de Suisse
Tour de Suisse